Scheuer (German: Scheuer "barn, granary" a topographic name for someone who lived near a conspicuous barn or near a tithe-barn.) is a surname. Notable people with the name include:

 Andreas Scheuer (born 1974), German politician
 Babe Scheuer (1913–1997), American football player
 Benjamin Scheuer, American songwriter
 David "Tebele" Scheuer (1712 – 1782), German rabbi
 Mechel Scheuer (1739 – 1810), German rabbi, son of David Tebele Scheuer
 Abraham Naftali-Hertz Scheuer (1755 – 1812), German rabbi, son of David Tebele Scheuer
 James H. Scheuer (1920 – 2005), New York politician
 Max Scheuer, Austrian footballer
 Michael F. Scheuer, CIA analyst
 Michael Scheuer (born 1927), German sprint canoer
 Raymond J. Scheuer (1887-1939), American politician and businessman
 Sandra Scheuer (1949 – 1970), victim of the Kent State shootings
 Steven H. Scheuer (born 1926), film- and television historian and -critic
 Sven Scheuer (born 1971, Böblingen), German professional footballer
 Tine Scheuer-Larsen (born 1966), Danish tennis player

German toponymic surnames
German-language surnames
Jewish surnames